The Broadwood Cup is an annual pre season football tournament in Cumbernauld, North Lanarkshire, Scotland. The tournament is co-hosted by Clyde and Cumbernauld Colts at Broadwood Stadium.

Background 

The Broadwood Cup was launched in September 2020. It was sponsored by Culture Leisure & North Lanarkshire (CLNL).

A four-team competition that features two semi finals. The winners advance to the final, while the losers play off for 3rd and 4th positions.

The inaugural tournament was played behind closed doors because of covid-19 restrictions. Supporters were able to return for the next edition.

The second tournament was streamed live by Gonzo Digital through TicketCo TV, but not the official Clyde FC Live channel.

Past tournaments 

After Clyde signed a shirt deal with British Oxygen Company (BOC) in 1979, the club held a BOC sponsored friendly tournament at Shawfield won by Ayr United.

Placings

References

External links 

Football in North Lanarkshire
Scottish football friendly trophies
Football cup competitions in Scotland
Clyde F.C.
Recurring sporting events established in 2020
2020 establishments in Scotland